Pikuniku is a puzzle adventure video game developed by French-British indie collective Sectordub and published by Devolver Digital, that was released on January 24, 2019 for Linux, macOS, Nintendo Switch and Microsoft Windows. It was later released on March 12, 2020 for Xbox One and on February 9, 2021 for Stadia. The player controls the titular red creature, Piku, through a colorful world, to put an end to a plot to harvest the entirety of the land's resources.

It received generally positive reviews from critics, with its main criticism being the short length of the game.

Gameplay
Pikuniku is a puzzle and adventure game where the player must control the protagonist, Piku, through levels and solve puzzles to progress. The majority of puzzles involve kicking and pushing objects onto switches to open doors and access rooms, allowing the player to proceed through the level. Piku can also lasso his legs to swing from hooks or curl into a ball and roll, allowing the player to move around faster and reach higher or previously inaccessible areas. Throughout the game, the player will encounter villages, where they can interact with villagers, and spend currency earned in the game's levels on items such as hats. The game also features a local cooperative mode with 9 levels, and the second player controlling Niku, an orange creature similar to Piku. Both of the players must cooperate to navigate themselves to a boat at the end of the level.

Synopsis
The game begins with the protagonist, Piku, waking up from his slumber in a cave. After venturing to a nearby village, locals become terrified of Piku. They locked him up in a cage calling him a 'ghastly beast of legend', settling on imprisoning him until he agrees to fix the town bridge, which he'd accidentally destroyed. After repairing the bridge and being set free from imprisonment, the town enlists him to help deal with the entrepreneurial Mr. Sunshine, a pink creature similar to Piku, who attempts to harvest the entirety of the world's natural resources for his own wealth.

Plot 
Mr. Sunshine, a pink creature who owns a company operating flying industrial robots and acts as the game's antagonist, seeks to automate towns over the land by offering a universal basic income to all citizens of the towns who sign his contract – allowing him to take their "trash" (actually primary goods like corn, which the game world inhabitants grow full time) in exchange of what he calls "free money".

After an unnamed village's automation, Piku is awakened by a ghost in a nearby cave. As he comes out, he discovers he's actually been erroneously painted by the village's artist as a dark beast, and after accidentally breaking the bridge, he is put in a cage by the frightened inhabitants. However, he is let free after it is discovered that he is virtually harmless.

Once Piku has earned the townsfolk's trust by fixing the bridge, he proceeds to explore the world, soon to be greeted by Mr. Sunshine himself on a flying robot. Along with three other people, he passively participates in a random extraction for a free tour of Mr. Sunshine's workplace. The raffle is won by one of the commoners in the crowd, a boy named Eli, who is taken to visit the magnate's secret volcano base.

Piku then travels through a swamp and reaches a forest, where he is tasked with defeating a dancing robot at a club. After witnessing an explosive attack against one of Mr. Sunshine's robots, Piku joins the Resistance, an environmental guerrilla trio of forest villagers based in an abandoned underground metro station who intend to stop Mr. Sunshine's evil doings by destroying his robots with exploding pine cones. Piku and the Resistance march onto a lake separating the forest from the volcano base, but they discover that it has been dried out by Mr. Sunshine. They decide to reach the base by passing through a series of mines located below the surface.

A family of black worms welcomes Piku and the Resistance in the abandoned mining site. The mother, a giant worm, recounts how they have been suffering due to the lack of the lake's water, which once spilled from the pipes. Before helping Piku in any way, she asks him to rescue her child Ernie, who has become significantly overweight after drinking radioactive water from a pipe further underground. After finding Ernie and transporting him through the cave, Piku discovers the fate of an unknown civilization, who perished in a Pompeii-like eruption disaster; the creatures' shape resembles Mr. Sunshine's, but it is unknown whether he is a survivor of a natural catastrophe or if he killed his own kind with the volcano. Once Ernie is brought back to his mother, the worms assist him in destroying Mr. Sunshine's last robot in exchange for his support.

The final portion of the game takes place inside Mr. Sunshine's underground base, where he is plotting to destroy the surrounding land by covering it with lava in order to establish a new city with perfect inhabitants – although such beings are actually genetically degenerate creations with low intelligence, made by splicing the genes of the townsfolk with the forest villagers; Eli is between the persons captured in the lab.

After leaving the laboratory, Piku reaches a pit over live magma where Mr. Sunshine tries to have him killed. Piku avoids Mr. Sunshine's robot's lasers until his robotic henchmen piloting it go on a strike after discovering they aren't equally paid. Suddenly, Ernie comes to the rescue by rolling into the pit and letting Piku use his body as a platform to jump out of it. Piku proceeds to chase Mr. Sunshine over the magma, avoiding pop corn launched from the latter's motorboat. Upon arriving at a dead end, Mr. Sunshine decides to press the button which will make the volcano erupt, but the lava is so unexpectedly powerful – Mr. Sunshine in fact states that he meant for the lava to cover the land, not erupt like a geyser – that they are both ejected into the atmosphere on a platform.

As Piku kicks him, Mr. Sunshine is sent into space. A supposedly all-knowing being (actually the ghost from the start of the game, now manifesting itself as a room with eyes) then rescues Piku through a magic hole, informing him of his mission's outcome before sending him safely back to the base. Piku leaves along with the other Resistance members, going back to sleep in his cave off-screen.

After the story's events, the player can still explore the slightly altered post-game world to achieve all trophies, completing whatever had been left behind during the main playthrough.

Reception

Pikuniku received "generally favorable reviews" on the Nintendo Switch and "mixed or average reviews" on the PC version of the game according to review aggregator Metacritic.

Accolades
The game was nominated for "Best International Indie Game" at the Pégases Awards 2020.

References

External links
 Official website

2019 video games
Adventure games
Devolver Digital games
Fantasy video games
Indie video games
Linux games
MacOS games
Multiplayer and single-player video games
Nintendo Switch games
Puzzle video games
Side-scrolling platform games
Stadia games
Video games about robots
Video games developed in France
Video games developed in the United Kingdom
Video games scored by Calum Bowen
Windows games
Xbox Cloud Gaming games